Shrum is a surname. Notable people with the surname include:

 Bob Shrum (born 1943), American political consultant
 Gordon Shrum (1896–1985), Canadian physicist and first chancellor of Simon Fraser University
 John Shrum (1935–1995), American television art director
 Pete Shrum (1931–1993), American murder victim